Kneep is a village on the Isle of Lewis, in the Outer Hebrides, Scotland. Kneep is within the parish of Uig.

Various archaeological discoveries have been made at Kneep, including a Viking cemetery and a number of Viking burials, as well as a cist. Other archaeological discoveries include prehistoric, Bronze Age and Iron Age sites in the dunes to the east of the settlement.

References

External links

Comann Eachdraidh Uig - Kneep
Hebridean Connections - Land Dispute, Valtos and Kneep

Villages in the Isle of Lewis